David Beck or Dave Beck may refer to:

David Beck (1621–1656), Dutch portrait painter
David Beck (musician), Australian drummer
David B. Beck, American physician-scientist
David L. Beck (born 1953), American leader in The Church of Jesus Christ of Latter-day Saints
Dave Beck (1894–1993), American labor leader
Dave Becky, American talent manager